Spondweni fever is an infectious disease caused by the Spondweni virus. It is characterized by a fever, chills, nausea, headaches, malaise and epistaxis.  Transmitted by mosquitoes, it is found in sub-Saharan Africa and Papua New Guinea.

References 

Viral diseases
Tropical diseases
Insect-borne diseases